C.M. Mayo  is an American literary journalist, novelist, memoirist, short story writer, poet, podcaster and noted literary translator of contemporary Mexican fiction and poetry. For various literary magazines and anthologies, she has translated works by Mexican writers and poets including Araceli Ardón, Agustín Cadena, Antonio Deltoro, Alvaro Énrigue, Eduardo Hurtado, Mónica Lavín, Guadalupe Loaeza, Tedi López Mills, Rose Mary Salum, Ignacio Solares, Juan Villoro, Verónica Volkow, among others. A Texas native, she was raised in Northern California and educated as an economist at the University of Chicago. She is a long-time resident of Mexico City.

Awards
 1995 Flannery O'Connor Award for Short Fiction, for Sky Over El Nido
 Lowell Thomas Travel Journalism Awards (Three Awards)
 Washington Independent Writers Awards (Three Awards)

Works
 Metaphysical Odyssey into the Mexican Revolution: Francisco I. Madero and His Secret Book, Spiritist Manual (Dancing Chiva, 2014) 
 
 
 
"BANK"; "NAFTA"; "THE EGG"; "IN THE NEW TERRITORIES"; "THE SEA IS CORTÉS", The Beltway Poetry Quarterly, Volume 5, Number 4, Fall 2004

Translations

External links
"Author's website"
"C.M. Mayo's Marfa Mondays Podcasting Project"
"National Public Radio John Ydsie Interviews C.M. Mayo about "Editing a Literary Tour of Mexico"
"Poet and the Poem Podcast, Library of Congress, Grace Cavalieri Interviews C.M. Mayo"
"Interview with C.M. Mayo on Dancing Chiva", John Randolph Bennett, March 31, 2011
"The C.M. Mayo Interview", The Quarterly Conversation, Summer 2007
"An Interview with C.M. Mayo", Whereabouts Press
"10 QUESTIONS FOR…C.M. Mayo, author of travel memoir & historical novel", Ask Wendy, March 1, 2009 
"SMALL PRESS SPOTLIGHT: C. M. MAYO", National Book Critics Circle, Apr-22-2008
"Interview: C.M. Mayo", DCist, September 2007
"C.M. Mayo, Editing a Literary Tour of Mexico", NPR
"Interview With C.M. Mayo, Author of The Last Prince of the Mexican Empire", Savvy Verse and Wit, May 4, 2009
"The Last Prince of the Mexican Empire by C.M. Mayo", Bookslut, May 2009
"C.M. Mayo Interview, Part I", Eight diagrams, June 30, 2006

21st-century American novelists
American women novelists
21st-century American memoirists
American women short story writers
University of Chicago alumni
Year of birth missing (living people)
Living people
American poets
American podcasters
Writers from Mexico City
American women memoirists
21st-century American women writers
21st-century American translators
21st-century American short story writers
American women podcasters